Virginia's 71st House of Delegates district elects one of the 100 members of the Virginia House of Delegates, the lower house of the state's bicameral legislature. District 71 is mainly in the city of Richmond.

The 71st district is represented by Democrat Jeff Bourne, who was elected in a February, 2017 special election.  Before that, the district had been represented by Democrat Jennifer McClellan since 2006.

District officeholders

References

Virginia House of Delegates districts
Richmond, Virginia